The College of Computer, Mathematical, and Natural Sciences (CMNS) at the University of Maryland, College Park, is home to ten academic departments and a dozen interdisciplinary research centers and institutes. CMNS is one of 13 schools and colleges within the University of Maryland, College Park.

In January 2015, CMNS had 339 tenure/tenure-track faculty members, 39,380 alumni, 4,912 undergraduate students and 1,424 graduate students.  In October 2010, the University of Maryland's College of Chemical and Life Sciences and College of Computer, Mathematical, and Physical Sciences merged to form the College of Computer, Mathematical, and Natural Sciences.

CMNS students receive national awards, including Rhodes, Truman, Goldwater, Fulbright and Hollings Scholarships; National Science Foundation Graduate Research Fellowships; and NASA Earth and Space Science Fellowships. In addition, undergraduate and graduate students conduct research in faculty research laboratories on campus or in the wide range of federal laboratories, research institutes and private companies in the Baltimore-Washington corridor.

Atmospheric and Oceanic Science 
The Department of Atmospheric and Oceanic Science (formerly the Department of Meteorology) is an academic department at the University of Maryland, College Park.

Affiliated institutions 
The Earth System Science Interdisciplinary Center (ESSIC) is a joint center between the Departments of Atmospheric and Oceanic Science, Geology, and Geographical Science at the University of Maryland, in cooperation with the NASA Goddard Space Flight Center. ESSIC also administers the Cooperative Institute for Satellite Earth System Studies, which is a joint center with the NOAA's National Centers for Environmental Prediction (NCEP) and the National Environmental Satellite, Data, and Information Service (NESDIS).

The NOAA Center for Weather and Climate Prediction, which houses NCEP's Weather Prediction Center, the Climate Prediction Center, the Ocean Prediction Center, and the Environmental Modeling Center, as well as the Air Resources Laboratory, is located in the University of Maryland's research park M Square. The department has various collaborations with NOAA laboratories as well as NASA Goddard.

Rankings 
In 2019, UMD was ranked 14th globally in the Academic Ranking of World Universities in atmospheric science. In 2018, it was ranked 9th. In the U.S. News & World Report rankings for best global universities in geosciences, UMD was ranked 12th in 2019. In the 2010 United States National Research Council rankings, the department was ranked in the top 10 national doctoral programs by both the average regression rank and the average survey rank. Its department of computer science is ranked 13th according to Computer Science Open Rankings, which combines scores from multiple independent rankings.

Faculty 

 Eugenia Kalnay
 Rachel Pinker

Former faculty 

 Antonio Busalacchi Jr.
 Andrew Dessler
 Helmut Landsberg
 Cliff Mass
 Alan Robock
 Jagadish Shukla

Notable faculty

Notable alumni and former students

References

External links
 

College of Computer, Mathematical, and Natural Sciences
Computer science departments in the United States
Computer, Mathematical, and Natural Sciences
Computer, Mathematical, and Natural Sciences